"Shout to the Top!" is a song by the English band the Style Council which was their seventh single to be released. It was composed by lead singer Paul Weller, and was released in 1984. It appears on the Vision Quest soundtrack in the United States.

The song also appears on the deluxe edition of Our Favourite Shop (1985), and features in the film Billy Elliot (2000) and on its soundtrack. Paintings representing the 1984 miners strike feature in the video.

Compilation appearances
As well as the song's single release, it has featured on various compilation albums released by The Style Council. The song was included on The Singular Adventures of The Style Council, The Complete Adventures of The Style Council, and Greatest Hits.

Track listings

7" single
A   "Shout to the Top!" (edit) – 3:16
B   "Ghosts of Dachau" – 2:55

12" single
A1   "Shout to the Top!" – 4:16
A2   "Shout to the Top!" (instrumental) – 4:12
B1   "The Piccadilly Trail" – 3:46
B2   "Ghosts of Dachau" – 2:51

Personnel
 Paul Weller - Lead vocals, guitars, string arrangement, producer
 Mick Talbot - Piano, backing vocals
 Steve White - Drums, percussion
 Kevin Miller - Bass
 Dee C. Lee - Backing vocals
 Alison Limerick - Backing vocals
 John Mealing - String arrangement

Charts

Weekly Charts

Year-end charts

Fire Island featuring Loleatta Holloway version

In 1998, "Shout to the Top!" was covered by English electronic music duo Fire Island, featuring Loleatta Holloway.  This version went to number one on the US dance chart, and also reached No. 23 on the UK Singles Chart. Remixes were made by Industry Standard, Club 69 and Frankie Knuckles.

See also
 List of number-one dance singles of 1998 (US)

References

External links
 Shout to the Top, BBC Radio 2 documentary, broadcast August 2003

1984 songs
1984 singles
1998 singles
The Style Council songs
Fire Island (duo) songs
Loleatta Holloway songs
Songs written by Paul Weller
Polydor Records singles
V2 Records singles